Ferguson Southward (21 October 1898 – December 1981) was an English professional rugby league footballer who played in the 1920s. He played at representative level for Cumberland, and at club level for Salford.

Background
Ferguson Southward was born in Cockermouth, Cumberland, England, and he died aged 83 in Cockermouth, Cumbria, England.

Playing career

County honours
Southward represented Cumberland while at Salford.

References

External links
Search for "Southward" at rugbyleagueproject.org

1898 births
1981 deaths
Cumberland rugby league team players
English rugby league players
Rugby league players from Cockermouth
Salford Red Devils players